Apsana Begum (born 25 May 1990) is a British Labour Party politician serving as the Member of Parliament (MP) for Poplar and Limehouse since 2019. She is Parliament's first hijab-wearing MP.

Early life and career
Begum was born in Shadwell, Tower Hamlets to Bengali Muslim parents Manir Uddin Ahmed and Syeda Nazma Begom. She has five sisters and a brother. Her ancestral home is in Ludorpur village of Jagannathpur, Sunamganj District, Bangladesh. Ahmed, who died in 2012, was a Labour Party councillor (representing the Shadwell ward), the Tower Hamlets Community Housing Board Director (2002–2006) and was the 2004 Mayor of Tower Hamlets. Begum completed her education at Queen Mary University of London, where she gained a BA (Hons) degree in Politics in 2011.

From 2011 to 2013, Begum worked in the role of Executive Support and Admin for Tower Hamlets Council. She was a Workforce Diversity Project Officer for Tower Hamlets Homes from 2014 to 2015, and Equality and Diversity Officer for Queen Mary University of London from 2016 to 2018.

Parliamentary career 
Begum was selected to contest the safe Labour seat of Poplar and Limehouse at the 2019 general election. She was endorsed by the left-wing group Momentum and nominated from an all-women shortlist.

Begum was subsequently elected as MP for Poplar and Limehouse, beating Conservative Sheun Oke by 28,904 votes. This was more than her predecessor Jim Fitzpatrick's 27,712 vote majority at the 2017 general election, and represented an increased majority for Labour, on a slightly reduced vote share.

Begum is a member of the left-wing Socialist Campaign Group of MPs. She is the UK's first Muslim woman MP to wear the hijab,

On being elected, Begum spoke to the Eastern Eye about what she described as a series of racist, Islamophobic and misogynistic attacks that she has had to endure, and the many barriers facing BAME women when getting involved in public life. During an interview with Dazed, she said "It has been quite horrendous...and it's been quite personalised in terms of attacks. Before being elected, you see other MPs go through that but you don't necessarily appreciate the impact it can have on someone as an individual."

In response to allegations that the ex-Mayor Lutfur Rahman was behind her political career, Begum told Eastlondonlines "It is grossly insulting, as well as being rooted in racism and misogyny, to assume that I have no agency of my own and that I must be a 'proxy' or 'stooge' for a man I have not spoken to for six years." Begum delivered her maiden speech in Parliament during a debate about International Women's Day, paying tribute to what she described as the "rich history of women's struggles for social justice" in East London.

On 24 February 2022, following the 2022 Russian invasion of Ukraine, Begum was one of 11 Labour MPs threatened with loss of the party whip after they signed a statement by the Stop the War Coalition which questioned the legitimacy of NATO and accused NATO of "eastward expansion". All 11 MPs then removed their signatures.

Islamophobia 
Begum commented in November 2020 that the Labour Party "has been in denial" about the problem of Islamophobia. She told ITV News: "It's quite regular to be asked questions and to constantly be asked to reaffirm my commitment towards British society as if in some way my identity and politics are not compatible." The same month, Begum secured cross-party backing for a motion in Parliament highlighting a surge in racist attacks and Islamophobia in Britain and abroad, and wrote about her experiences "as someone who has first-hand experience of the rise in Islamophobia over the past decades" saying that "I know that every single day people of Muslim backgrounds like me face discrimination and prejudice."

COVID-19 and black, Asian and minority ethnic people 
On 9 April 2020, in an article published by Left Foot Forward, Begum raised concerns about the impact of the COVID-19 pandemic on low-income families and black, Asian and minority ethnic people. She said that the communities were at a greater risk due to the proportion of members who worked in the health sector. On 12 May, Begum raised the issue again in Parliament, highlighting new data released by Tower Hamlet's Council.

Julian Assange 
Begum has opposed extradition of Julian Assange and sponsored a related motion in parliament.

Antisemitism 
In 2019, Begum was criticised for sharing a social media post in 2017 that referred to Saudi Arabia's "Zionist masters". In response, Apsana Begum unshared the post and said “I didn’t make those comments and I shared the article because I was concerned with the treatment of pilgrims who were being harassed in the Mecca Grand Mosque. The original poster used words that were inappropriate, and I wouldn’t use them myself. I’m committed to fighting antisemitism both inside the Labour Party and in wider society.”After an antisemitic attack in Tower Hamlets in July 2019, Begum spoke at a local protest saying"As a Bengali woman from East London, I say to those who seek to divide society with fear and intolerance – not on our streets, not in our communities, not anywhere. Antisemitism in all its forms must and will be defeated. And to Jewish communities here in Tower Hamlets and beyond, I say … solidarity. We stand with you and together we will overcome."In 2020, in response to the EHRC's report into Labour Party, Begum tweeted that she accepted the recommendations and urged for them to be implemented without delay. She said "the hurt of antisemitism on the Jewish community is unacceptable. We must come together in solidarity against antisemitism, Islamophobia & all forms of racism."

Personal life 
After graduating in 2011, Begum moved back to her parents' house, and then started a relationship with Ehtashamul Haque, a member of Tower Hamlets Council. After her father died in 2012, her family learnt of the relationship and, Haque being twice divorced and older than her, disapproved of it. Begum and Haque married in May 2013, with none of the family attending, and her possesssions were left in bin liners outside the family's house.  She moved into her husband's residence, but she has alleged that he was abusive towards her, and then cheated on her, leading her to end the marriage in October 2015. She reconciled with her family, and slept on a sofa in their living room.

In January 2020, Begum wrote in a tweet that she had suffered from domestic abuse. She went on to become chair of the All-Party Parliamentary Group on Domestic Violence and Abuse.

Council housing fraud allegations
After selection as Labour's candidate for Poplar and Limehouse, Begum was investigated over whether she wrongly secured a social housing flat.

When she returned from university to her family home in 2011, she had shared a bedroom with her sister and aunt, while her parents and brother used the two other bedrooms in the house. So she applied for social housing from Tower Hamlets Council, stating the house had only three bedrooms. That classed it as overcrowded, giving her some priority in the queue. When she moved in with her husband in 2013, Begum notified the council. In addition, she notified the authority's council tax department about the move, which, she has claimed, she assumed would be passed to the housing department, a different department of the Council, without responsibility for council tax.

When, in 2016, Begum left her husband after the breakdown of her marriage, she once again contacted the council by phone and was sent a form to complete.  Shortly afterwards she secured a rented one-bed flat.

In October 2019, a senior executive at Tower Hamlets Council received a complaint concerning Begum's housing allocation from her ex-husband's brother-in law.  She was interviewed in January 2020, when it was alleged she had lied about not having her own bedroom. She was also accused of failing to notify the Council when she moved to her husband's home in 2013. She denied wrongdoing.

In 2020, Begum was charged with three counts of fraud dating between 18 January 2013 and 31 March 2016, relating to the charge that she dishonestly failed to disclose information. She stated that she was going to "vigorously contest" the charges.

At the trial, evidence was presented that she had been applying for council properties during her marriage to Haque, which she said he did without her knowledge. Begum's defence barrister presented the court with evidence about the pattern of the bidding which she argued suggested two different people were bidding. She argued that she was a victim of domestic abuse, coercive control and financial abuse and, on 30 July 2021, she was found not guilty on all charges.

References

External links

Living people
1990 births
21st-century Bengalis
21st-century English women politicians
21st-century Muslims
Alumni of Queen Mary University of London
British politicians of Bangladeshi descent
English people of Bangladeshi descent
English socialists
English Sunni Muslims
Female members of the Parliament of the United Kingdom for English constituencies
Incidents of domestic violence
Islamophobia in the United Kingdom
Labour Party (UK) MPs for English constituencies
People from Shadwell
People from the London Borough of Tower Hamlets
People from Jagannathpur Upazila
People acquitted of crimes
UK MPs 2019–present